Sydney Young (3 March 1918 – 15 June 2013) was an Australian rules footballer who played with South Melbourne Football Club in the Victorian Football League (VFL) and Claremont Football Club in the Western Australian Football League (WAFL). He died in 2013.

References
 

Holmesby, Russell & Main, Jim (2007). The Encyclopedia of AFL Footballers. 7th ed. Melbourne: Bas Publishing.

Australian rules footballers from Western Australia
VFL/AFL players born in England
Sydney Swans players
Claremont Football Club players
1918 births
2013 deaths
English emigrants to Australia